Peapatch is an unincorporated community in Buchanan County, Virginia and McDowell County, West Virginia, United States, straddling the Virginia–West Virginia border.

History
The Peapatch post office closed in 1939. Peapatch was named from the production of peas.

References 

Unincorporated communities in Buchanan County, Virginia
Unincorporated communities in McDowell County, West Virginia
Unincorporated communities in West Virginia
Unincorporated communities in Virginia